Cootapatamba Hut is a survival shelter in the river valley south of Mount Kosciuszko, in the Kosciuszko National Park, New South Wales, Australia.

External links
 Kosciuszko Huts Association information page

Mountain huts in Australia
Snowy Mountains
Kosciuszko National Park